The vice-president of Bangladesh was formerly the second highest constitutional office in Bangladesh, when the country was governed under a presidential system. The Vice-President was the first person in the presidential line of succession, in the event of a President's resignation, removal or death. The post was held by several Bangladeshi statesmen during different periods of the country's history. The inaugural office holder was Syed Nazrul Islam during the Bangladesh Liberation War. The final office holder was Shahabuddin Ahmed. Abdus Sattar was the only vice-president to succeed to the presidency in 1981.

The office was first created in the Provisional Government of Bangladesh in 1971. It was later revived in 1977, abolished in the 1982 coup d'état; and reinstated in 1986. It was abolished again during the Twelfth Amendment to the Constitution.

Key
Political parties

Other factions

Vice-presidents

References

Bangladesh
Lists of political office-holders in Bangladesh
Vice presidents of Bangladesh